Brian Ford may refer to:

 Brian Ford (numerical analyst), numerical analyst and founder of the Numerical Algorithms Group 
Brian Ford (cricketer) (born 1970), New Zealand cricketer
Brian Ford (police officer), Ottawa Police Service police chief, 1993–2000
Brian Ford (ice hockey) (born 1961), former NHL player
Brian J. Ford (born 1939), scientist, broadcaster and author
Brian Ford (British radio broadcaster), works for Scottish radio station 1152 Clyde 2
Brian Ford (rugby union) (born 1951), New Zealand rugby player